James Stephen Omajuwa “Jimmy” Omagbemi (26 November 1930 – 12 November 2012) was a Nigerian track and field athlete who represented the country at the 1958 Commonwealth Games in Cardiff. At the games, he was fifth in the 100 yards and won silver in the  4×100 yards relay. He participated in the 1960 and 1964 Summer Olympics but did not medal.  He attended San Jose State College and was coached by Bud Winter.

Competition record

References

1930 births
2012 deaths
Olympic athletes of Nigeria
Athletes (track and field) at the 1960 Summer Olympics
Athletes (track and field) at the 1964 Summer Olympics
Nigerian male sprinters
Commonwealth Games silver medallists for Nigeria
Commonwealth Games medallists in athletics
Athletes (track and field) at the 1958 British Empire and Commonwealth Games
San Jose State Spartans men's track and field athletes
Members of Thames Valley Harriers
Medallists at the 1958 British Empire and Commonwealth Games